The Northwestern Ontario Sports Hall of Fame, established in 1978 in Thunder Bay, Ontario, Canada, is dedicated to the people of Northwestern Ontario who have achieved greatness in sport. It is located on 219 South May Street in Downtown Fort William.

Notable inductees
 Andrea Cole, former Paralympic swimmer.
 Fred Kearney (1897–1998), former Canadian ice hockey player for the St. Louis Flyers.
 Fred Page (1915–1997), president of the Canadian Amateur Hockey Association and vice-president of the International Ice Hockey Federation, inducted into the Hockey Hall of Fame
 Frank Sargent (1902–1988), president of the Canadian Amateur Hockey Association and Dominion Curling Association, inducted into the Canadian Curling Hall of Fame
 Dave Siciliano (born 1946), ice hockey coach for the Lakehead Nor'Westers, Thunder Bay Flyers, Edmonton Ice, Owen Sound Platers, and the Sioux City Musketeers

References

1978 establishments in Ontario
Ontario North
Awards established in 1978
Canadian sports trophies and awards
Halls of fame in Canada
Museums in Thunder Bay
Ontario awards
Organizations based in Thunder Bay

Sport in Thunder Bay
Sports museums in Canada